Sensuntepeque is a town and municipality in the Cabañas department of El Salvador. It is the seat of the department and principal town in the area.

History
In the local Pipil language (also called "Nawat", and similar to Nahuatl), Sensuntepeque means "400 hills." The name refers to the many hills in the region. The area was first inhabited by the Lenca people. However, the town itself was founded as a Pipil people village in 1550, and in 1799 it became head of the party of Titihuapa. Colonized by the Spanish, it became an evangelical village. On December 20, 1811, its population rose against Spanish colonial rule. It proclaimed independence in 1821, during the government of José María Cornejo (1829-1832) and formally raised its status to that of a town.

In March 1871, the town was raided by Salvadorian Liberals with Honduran Army backing after Honduras declared war on El Salvador.

In 1948 the town had a population of about 8,000 people. During the war in El Salvador, the road between Sensuntepeque and Ilobasco was important for communications in the area, and one or two patrols a day were made with 25-30 soldiers in the mid-1980s.

In 2013, the Archangel St. Michael Catholic School in the El Nazareno colonia added new classrooms and renovated some of the older buildings; this occurred with the financial assistance of the Japanese government. In April 2013, sellers on several main streets at the entrance to the city were evicted by municipal employees. The move was necessitated by civic construction projects, such as renovation of the bus terminal, and the addition of street signs and crosswalks.

Geography and demographics
It is geographically distributed into 22 cantons and 236 rural villages. The urban area is divided into four barrios and 28 colonias. Nearby springs include Catorce de Julio,  to the south, La Mina,  to the northwest, and El Chorro,  to the north. Notable landmarks are the Town Hall, a prison, several churches, and a park. It has a population of about 45,000 inhabitants, up from approximately 8,000 inhabitants in 1951. Initially, the water supply was from a springs known as Catorce de Julio (fourteenth of July springs about 1 mile away from the city in the head reaches of a valley)) which provided 12,000 gallons of water per day. Many other springs have been tapped since then to meet the growing water supply needs of the city.

The city's scenic setting is an attraction to visitors. The road to the city passes winding through hills and valleys.

Climate
The city has a salubrious climate. The climate data for Sensuntepeque, the capital of the region, is given below.

Economy
The economy of the city in colonial times was based on producing indigo. Crops grown today include coffee, sugarcane, henequen, and grains.

References

External links
El Salvador Tourist Guide article
Sensuntepeque El Salvador. The municipality of 400 hills.

Municipalities of the Cabañas Department